This is a list of business schools in Connecticut, arranged in alphabetical order.

References

External links
Connecticut Business Schools

 
Connecticut